The International Association for Quantitative Finance (IAQF), formerly the International Association of Financial Engineers (IAFE), is a non-profit professional society dedicated to fostering the fields of quantitative finance and financial engineering. The IAQF hosts several panel discussions throughout the year to discuss the issues that affect the industry from both academic and professional angles. Since it was established in 1992, the IAQF has expanded its reach to host events in San Francisco, Toronto, Boston, and London.

Fischer Black Memorial Foundation
The educational arm of the IAQF is the Fischer Black Memorial Foundation (FBMF). While the IAQF focuses on the profession of financial engineering, the FBMF aims to expose students to the financial engineering field and help them work towards a career in the industry. Financial engineering is often underrepresented on university campuses and the FBMF tries to bridge the gap between academia and the professional world. The main tool of the FBMF is the very successful "How I Became a Quant" event series that bring professionals to college campuses to tell students about their experiences getting into the field. The FBMF also co-hosts (along with SIAM and New York University) an annual career fair that draws students from all over the country to meet with the premier hiring companies in the industry. This is one of the only career fairs that is specifically for financial engineering and it is hugely popular with both the students and companies.

Events

Often, these events are evening panels with 3–4 speakers; both practitioners and academics typically sit on these panels. Much of the information presented at these events is available afterward on the IAQF website.

Every year, the IAQF honors one member of the financial engineering world with its Financial Engineer of the Year (FEOY) award. The winner is selected through an exhaustive nomination and voting process and the list of former winners illustrates the high standards that the nominees must meet. Former FEOY recipients continue to serve the IAQF as Senior Fellows and include such notable names as Myron Scholes, Robert Merton, William Sharpe, and Jonathan Ingersoll.

The winner of the FEOY is celebrated at an annual Gala-dinner hosted by the IAQF and traditionally held at the United Nations building in New York City. This event is attended by many of the most distinguished members of the field and is one of the most important evenings on the IAQF calendar.

The IAQF hosts an annual conference in the late spring, which is an all day event which includes some of the biggest names in the industry. The schedule consists of 2–3 panels and a keynote speech by the previous year’s Financial Engineer of the Year, all of which circle around one common theme. The conference is one of the most highly attended and anticipated events of the year.

Financial Engineer of the Year (FEOY)
Commencing in 1993, this award has been presented annually to an individual who has made a significant contribution in the development and creative application of financial engineering. An award dinner is held annually to honor the achievements of Financial Engineer of the Year. All listed recipients are IAQF Senior Fellows.

2022  Hélyette Geman
2021  Dilip B. Madan
2020  Paul Glasserman
2019  Cliff Asness
2018  Francis Longstaff
2017  Michael Brennan
2016  Hayne Leland
2015  Eduardo Schwartz
2014  Martin L. Leibowitz
2013  Douglas T. Breeden
2012  Robert Litzenberger
2011  Robert F. Engle
2010  Peter P. Carr
2009  Richard Roll
2008  Robert Litterman
2007  Jack L. Treynor
2006  James H. Simons
2005  Phelim Boyle
2004  Oldrich A. Vasicek
2003  J. Darrell Duffie
2002  Jonathan E. Ingersoll, Jr.
2001  Andrew Lo
2001  Myron S. Scholes (Lifetime Achievement)
2000  Emanuel Derman
1999  John C. Hull
1998  John C. Cox
1997  Robert A. Jarrow
1996  Stephen A. Ross
1995  Mark Rubinstein
1994  Fischer Black
1993  Robert C. Merton

Board of directors
The IAQF is currently presided over by a 15-member Board of Directors. The members of the Board come from many different backgrounds and include many influential names in the industry. This diverse group controls the biggest decisions of the IAQF and helps ensure that the organization is fulfilling its mission towards the growth of financial engineering.

Committees
The IAQF comprises six committees: the Credit Risk, Education, Investor Risk, Liquidity Risk, Operational Risk, and Technology Committees each focus on a narrow view of financial engineering. Doing so enables the IAQF to stay up-to-date on advancements from all over the industry as well as organize well-developed, specific topics at each of their events, which are typically presented by one of the committees.

References

External links

Business and finance professional associations
Mathematical finance